Howe-Waffle House and Medical Museum is an 1889 Queen Anne style home in Santa Ana, California. It was the home of Dr. Willella Howe-Waffle, one of the first female physicians in Orange County, California, until her death in 1924.

History

Dr. Willella Howe-Waffle was one of the first female physicians in Orange County, California.  Her thirty-eight years of practice started in 1886 after she graduated from Hahnemann Medical College in Chicago.   Her dedication to her patients lasted until her very last day, as she died by the bed of a patient at the Santa Ana Community Hospital in 1924.  She was seventy-four years old.

Built in 1889 (the same year Orange County became a county), this Queen Anne style house was the home of Dr. Howe-Waffle until her death in 1924.  In the early 1970s, the City of Santa Ana slated the home for demolition in order to widen a road, but concerned area citizens joined forces to preserve the house.  Under the leadership of Adeline Walker, Friends of the Howe Waffle House formed.  This group later became known as the Santa Ana Historical Preservation Society.  The organization worked hard to raise awareness, and in 1974 the City of Santa Ana agreed to pay to move the house if the Society would pay for the foundation and restoration work.  Between March 27–29, 1975, the City moved the house to its present location on the corner of Civic Center and Sycamore.  The Society worked tirelessly over the years to restore the home to how it would have looked during Dr. Howe-Waffle's time.

The all volunteer Santa Ana Historical Preservation Society continues to run the home today as the Dr. Willella Howe-Waffle House and Medical Museum, and it is open for tours six times a year.

References

 Guy Ball, "The Saving of a Historic Home . . . The Beginning of a Historical Society", 2009.
 Roberta Reed, "The Saving of a Historic Home", 2009.

External links
Santa Ana Historical Preservation Society

Houses in Orange County, California
Carriage houses
Buildings and structures in Santa Ana, California
History of Santa Ana, California
Culture of Santa Ana, California
Organizations based in Santa Ana, California
Historic house museums in California
Medical museums in the United States
Museums in Orange County, California
Houses on the National Register of Historic Places in California
National Register of Historic Places in Orange County, California
Houses completed in 1889
Queen Anne architecture in California